Exit the Dragon, Enter the Tiger (Chinese title: 天皇巨星; Cantonese: Tian huang ju xing), also released as Bruce Lee: The Star of Stars, is a 1976 Bruceploitation film starring Bruce Li. The title is a play on the Bruce Lee film Enter the Dragon and is one of the most well-known films in the Bruceploitation genre.

Plot
The film tells the story of Tiger, a student of Bruce Lee, who comes to Hong Kong in search of answers regarding the mysterious death of his master. The character Susie Yung represents Betty Ting Pei. She and Tiger team up and take on the Hong Kong mafia in search of the truth regarding the death of the martial arts legend.

Cast
 Bruce Li as David/The Tiger
 Yi Chang as The Baron
 Kang Chin as Wa
 Lung Fei as Lung Fei
 Chang Sing Yee as Susie
 Shan Mao as Sam

Production

Music
The film's music was composed by Fu Liang Chou under the name of Chow Fook-Leung. Similar to other film scores by Fu Liang Chou, excerpts from popular music of that time can be heard interpolated in the score. These excerpts include pieces of John Barry's 1974 score to The Man with the Golden Gun, Pink Floyd's "Shine On You Crazy Diamond", and Isaac Hayes' theme to Three Tough Guys, among others.

Sequel

In 1978 a sequel was released titled Return of the Tiger. Li returned as a different character and the film co-starred Angela Mao.

References

External links
 .
 

1976 action films
1976 films
1976 martial arts films
Kung fu films
Hong Kong martial arts films
Bruceploitation films
1970s Mandarin-language films
1970s Hong Kong films
1980s Hong Kong films